Rachanon Srinork (born June 24, 1989) is a professional footballer from Thailand.

References

External links
 

1989 births
Living people
Rachanon Srinork
Association football wingers
Rachanon Srinork
Rachanon Srinork
Rachanon Srinork
Rachanon Srinork
Rachanon Srinork
Rachanon Srinork
Rachanon Srinork
Rachanon Srinork
Rachanon Srinork
Rachanon Srinork